Romualdo Dantas e Silva, best known as Romualdo (born 4 November 1974) is a Brazilian former association football player, who played as a forward, best known for his performances for Gama.

Honours
Gama
 Campeonato Brasileiro Série B: 1998

Figueirense
 Campeonato Catarinense: 2004

References

1974 births
Association football forwards
Brazilian footballers
Campeonato Brasileiro Série A players
Living people
Sociedade Esportiva do Gama players